Mercury is an unincorporated community in McCulloch County, Texas, United States. According to the Handbook of Texas, the community had an estimated population of 166 in 2000.

It is situated along FM 502 in northeastern McCulloch County, approximately 22 miles northeast of Brady.  It is the community closest to the geometric center of Texas.

The community was founded in 1904, shortly after the arrival of the Fort Worth and Rio Grande Railroad. Mercury became a livestock shipping point and by 1914, had an estimated population of 550. Two major fires in 1919 and 1929 severely impacted the community. In 1938, the struggling community was bypassed by the Brady-Brownwood highway. Mercury continued to decline and the population fell from 489 in 1933 to 360 in 1949. By 2000, the number of inhabitants stood at 166.

Currently there is only one original building standing in the Town of Mercury. It is the Bank Of Mercury building that was built by Thomas Jefferson Beasley in 1903 as a bank and mercantile store. Through the years the building has exchanged hands several times, however in 2012 the Grandson of the original owner, Thomas Lee Beasley purchased the building and is currently trying to preserve the remainder of the building. The only thing that remains of the building are the four outer walls and the vault that Thomas Jefferson Beasley built. It is rumored that the vault has a dome that is filled with sand. Thomas Jefferson's theory was that if someone were to blow the safe, the top would collapse and cover everything in sand. By the time the would-be thieves got to anything everyone in town would be there to see what was going on.

Public education in the community of Mercury is provided by the Rochelle Independent School District.

References

External links

Unincorporated communities in McCulloch County, Texas
Unincorporated communities in Texas